Forrester may refer to:

 Forrester, Oklahoma, a community in the United States
 Forrester Research, a market research company
 Forrester RFC, a Scottish Rugby Union football club
 Forrester (surname), people with the surname Forrester

See also
 Finding Forrester, a 2000 film starring Rob Brown and Sean Connery
 Forester (disambiguation) without double r
 Forster (disambiguation)